Eight ships and a shore establishment of the Royal Navy have borne the name HMS Vulcan, after the god Vulcan, of Roman mythology:

Ships

  was an 8-gun fireship launched in 1691 and sunk as a breakwater in 1709.
  was an 8-gun fireship, previously the civilian Hunter. She was purchased in 1739 and hulked in 1743.
  was an 8-gun fireship, previously the civilian Mary. She was purchased in 1745 and sold in 1749.
  was an 8-gun fireship, previously an American merchantman. She was purchased in 1777 and destroyed in 1782 to prevent her capture.
  was a 14-gun fireship launched in 1783. She was destroyed in 1793 to prevent her capture.
  was a 10-gun bomb vessel, previously the civilian Hector. She was purchased in 1796 and was sold in 1802.
 HMS Vulcan was to have been an iron paddle frigate. She was renamed  in 1843 before being launched in 1845.
  was an iron screw frigate launched in 1849. She was converted to a troopship in 1851 and was sold in 1867 as the barque Jorawur.
  was a depot ship launched in 1889. She was converted to a training hulk and renamed HMS Defiance III in 1931 and was scrapped in 1955. Two replacement ships were named HMS Vulcan II:
  was HMS Vulcan II between 1919 and 1924.
  was HMS Vulcan II between 1923 and 1930.
  was a trawler used as a depot ship for Coastal Forces, then serving as a repair ship for a minesweeping flotilla, being paid off in 1947. HMS Vulcan was involved in lifesaving after the Air Raid on Bari and had some mustard gas casualties as a result.

Establishments

 HMS Vulcan was the Ministry of Defence naval nuclear reactor shore establishment at Dounreay between 1970 and 1981, when it was renamed the Vulcan Naval Reactor Test Establishment.

See also
 , a paddle steamer used in trials against  in 1839.

Royal Navy ship names